Westbrook is the third station on the West LRT line of the CTrain light rail system in Calgary, Alberta. The station, along with the rest of the line, opened on December 10, 2012. However, on December 8, 2012, it was opened as a preview for the public to use.

The station is located underground beside 33 Street SW between Bow Trail and 17 Avenue SW, 4 km from the 7 Avenue & 9 Street SW Interlocking. The station occupies the site of the former Ernest Manning High School, which closed in June 2011, and a former Petro-Canada service station that closed in 2009. The school and station were demolished to make room for this station and a new school (using the same name) was built 3.5 kilometres away near the 69 Street SW station. The new school opened in September 2011. The Westbrook station also offers a new BRT service to Mount Royal University and Heritage station.

The station platform is located underground, with two entrances above ground, and is the first operational underground CTrain station in Calgary. A station was planned for under Calgary's Olympic Plaza. However, only the approach tunnel exists below Calgary's Municipal Building, as part of a subway system that was partially built and mothballed in the mid-1980s. The station was built with provisions for a spur line to Mount Royal University in the future.

The platform is side-loading and is connected via two entrances: the north entrance is located in the lobby of a four-storey office block constructed on the former site of the service station; the south entrance is via a standalone building. An escalator, stairs and an elevator provide access to the platform at both entrances. A small bus loop has been constructed near the north entrance which also doubles as an access road to the nearby Westbrook Mall.

In its first year of service, Westbrook served an average of 8,180 boardings per day.

The station primarily serves the communities of Spruce Cliff, Rosscarrock, and Killarney. Also, the Westbrook Mall is located near this station and the general area is part of the Westbrook Area Redevelopment Plan (ARP).

In April 2016, a Calgary Public Library branch, named the Nicholls Family Library, opened inside the station to replace the nearby Shaganappi branch.

References

CTrain stations
Railway stations located underground in Canada
Railway stations in Canada opened in 2012
2012 establishments in Alberta